The Lima leaf-toed gecko (Phyllodactylus sentosus) has been registered in six archeological sites in Lima, Peru, where it is endemic. It is considered a species in critical danger.

References

 Cossios E.D. and Icochea J. 2006. "New records of the Lima gecko, Phyllodactylus sentosus (Reptilia, Geckonidae)." Ecologia Aplicada 5:182-184.
 Dixon J.R. and Huey R.B. 1970. "Systematics of the lizards of the gekkonid genus Phyllodactylus of mainland South America." Contributions in science, Los Angeles County Museum of Natural History 192: 1-78.

Reptiles of Peru
Phyllodactylus
Reptiles described in 1970
Taxa named by James R. Dixon